

The SAIMAN 202 was a 1930s Italian two-seat cabin monoplane designed and built by the Società Industrie Meccaniche Aeronautiche Navali (SAIMAN).

Development
Designed in response to an Italian Air Ministry requirement for a two-seat cabin monoplane, the SAIMAN 202 prototype (registered I-BOTT) first flew in early 1938.
The 202 was a low-wing cantilever monoplane with a fixed tailwheel landing gear. It had a nose-mounted 120 hp (74 kW) de Havilland Gipsy Major engine. An enclosed cockpit had side-by-side seating for two. The first production aircraft were for civilian use with Italian training organisations and designated SAIMAN 202bis. The 202bis had only minor cabin changes but the next variant (the 202/I) was a major re-design with an improved fuselage re-positioned tailplane. To compete in a 1939 touring aircraft rally two special aircraft were developed; a 202 RL with an Alfa Romeo 110 engine  which were now standard for the civilian production aircraft, and the 204 R which was a four-seater with lengthened cabin and longer nose and powered by an Alfa Romeo 115 engine.

Operational history
To meet an urgent operational requirement for military trainers, the Regia Aeronautica ordered a simplified version of the 202 RL as the 202/M in October 1939. CNA built 85, SACA built 65 and SAIMAN built 215 aircraft for the Regia Aeronautica flying schools. Aircraft were also used for liaison duties and Italian Air Attaches. A number of aircraft were captured.

Variants
SAIMAN 202
Prototype with 120hp (74kW) de Havilland Gipsy Major engine.
SAIMAN 202bis
Civil production aircraft
SAIMAN 202/I
Improved version
SAIMAN 202 RL
One special variant for rally use.
SAIMAN 202/M
Military production aircraft, 365 built.
SAIMAN 204 R
One four-seat variant for rally use.

Operators

Air Force of the Independent State of Croatia

Regia Aeronautica
Italian Co-Belligerent Air Force

Italian Air Force  operated some SAIMAN 202 until 1951

Specifications

See also

References

 

1930s Italian civil utility aircraft
1930s Italian military trainer aircraft
Low-wing aircraft
Single-engined tractor aircraft
Aircraft first flown in 1938